The Qatar Chamber was founded in 1963 as the Qatar Chamber of Commerce and Industry to promote and protect the interests of companies in the agricultural, industrial and commercial sectors of the economy of the country.

Operations 
It also provides administrative services, advice and arbitration. It is a member of the Indo-Arab Chamber of Commerce and Industries.

The body is chaired by Khalifa bin Jassim Al Thani.

References

Economy of Qatar
Chambers of commerce